Satisfactory is a factory simulation game created by Swedish video game developer Coffee Stain Studios. It is a 3D first-person open world exploration and factory building game. The player, a pioneer, is dropped onto an alien planet with a handful of tools and must harvest the planet's natural resources to construct increasingly complex factories for automating all resource needs. The initial goal is to build a space elevator and begin supplying the company the player works for (FICSIT Inc.) with increasingly numerous and complex components for their unknown purposes. Those exports unlock new buildings that make the next export possible.

Satisfactory was made available for early access on 19 March 2019 on the Epic Games Store, and 8 June 2020 on Steam, with cross-platform multiplayer. The factory building aspect of the game has been described as a first-person and 3D version of Factorio. Unlike most other sandbox games like Factorio, the Satisfactory world is pre-generated; every player's map is identical. The game is set on an alien planet named "Massage-2(A-B)b" and the playable area is limited to 30 km2.

Gameplay 
The player takes the role of an engineer who has been sent to the planet with orders to "colonize" it by building a factory complex for FICSIT. The player has a choice of four starting locations: the Grasslands, the Rocky Desert, the Dune Desert, or the Northern Forest. This choice affects the resources the player has access to in the early game and the amount of flat land available for easy building. However, the player can move to any other part of the map at any time. After landing, the player must salvage the landing pod for parts with which to construct the HUB, the main base from which most other construction will extend.

During a brief tutorial, the player learns how to mine and process basic ores such as iron and copper. With these materials, it is possible to construct a simple factory and to begin exploring the "Tier" system. As of May 2021, there are eight such tiers in the game, each of which grants access to increasingly complex and sophisticated materials and equipment. Tiers one and two are unlocked after completing the tutorial; subsequent tiers are unlocked by delivering certain parts to the space elevator.

As the player unlocks new equipment, it becomes possible to automate more complicated tasks. The ultimate goals of the game are to build a fully automated factory that can manufacture any item without requiring the player's manual intervention and to deliver all required project parts to the space elevator. Higher-level machinery requires more power, so the player must research and build power systems including coal and fuel generators, and eventually nuclear power plants.

Exploration and combat are secondary gameplay elements. The player must fight hostile alien life forms and conquer hazardous environments in order to find valuable resources in the wilderness. A limited number of weapons and vehicles are available to make exploration easier.  With Update 7, released December 6, 2022, blueprints were added to the game, allowing creation of templates to facilitate mass construction of production buildings.

Sales
Within three months of its early-access release, over 500,000 copies had been sold. By July 2020, more than 1.3 million copies had been sold. Based on data collected by Simon Carless in mid-2021, Satisfactory had made at least  in revenue, surpassing the amount that Epic Games had assured as a minimum payout to Coffee Stain.

References

External links
Official Website
Official YouTube Channel

Upcoming video games
Coffee Stain Studios games
Construction and management simulation games
First-person video games
Open-world video games
Indie video games
Video games developed in Sweden
Video games set on fictional planets
Windows games
Windows-only games
Multiplayer and single-player video games
Unreal Engine games
Early access video games